Grupo América, formerly known as Grupo UNO Medios, and also known as the Vila-Manzano Group, is a multimedia company in Argentina created by the Mendoza entrepreneurs Daniel Vila and the ex-politician and businessman José Luis Manzano. Is one of the owners of América TV (along with businessman Claudio Belocopitt), as well as many other TV channels, newspapers, radios and digital businesses (telephony and broadband) throughout the country.

In addition to América TV, other of the most well-known media in its portfolio are Channel 6 of San Rafael, Channel 7 of Mendoza and Channel 8 of San Juan, Radio Nihuil, Diario Uno Mendoza and La Capital multimedia, of Rosario. In April 2017 they re-launched the A24 signal with a new and renewed programming.

Previously, the cable television operator Supercanal belonged to the group, which was sold in the month of July 2018 to the CVI Austral LLP group with an approximate amount of US$180 million.

Products 
The media owned are the following:

Newspapers

AM/FM radios

Television

Free-to-air television

Cable television

Digital newspapers

Suspicions of corruption 
The media group, like their owners and the businesses they share among them, he has been repeatedly denounced for fraud and money laundering, as well as unfair dismissals.

Notes

References

External links 
 

 
Mass media companies of Argentina
Mass media companies established in 1983
Conglomerate companies of Argentina